Awbare (Amharic: አውበሬ), officially known as Teferi Ber and called after its patron Saint Awbare, is a town in eastern Ethiopia located in the Fafan Zone of the Somali Region, near the border with Somaliland on the main trade route between Jijiga and the sea. It is the administrative center or the capital of Awbare.

It was one of the biggest towns of the Adal Empire.  According to Ethiopian Christian folklore, this town was the only gateway that has caused fear for the Ethiopian Christian Kingdom, hence the name Teferi Ber, meaning "The Gate of Fear".

The main trade route between Jijiga and the sea passes through Awbare; an ancient route to Zeila almost always went through Awbare. In 1962 it was described as a dry weather road. The Ethiopian News Agency reported in early 1998 that much khat was illegally smuggled out of Ethiopia by this route.

When emperor Haile Selassie inspected the region in 1935 prior to the outbreak of the Second Italo-Ethiopian War, Haile Selassie made a secret two-day excursion to Awbare. The Italian Giuda described Awbare in 1938 as a Somali village with about 1,000 inhabitants, whose houses were partly built of masonry, and possessing a mosque; a little to the west of the village was the tomb of the patron Saint Awbare.

During his research in the ancient town of Amud, the historian G.W.B. Huntingford noticed that whenever an old site had the prefix Aw in its name (such as the ruins of Awbare and Awbube), it denoted the final resting place of a local saint.

History

Awbare is one of the oldest inhabited cities in Ethiopia, known as Teferi Ber  which in Amharic denotes the name of Ras Tafari Makonnen's (Ge'ez ) Gate of Fear, a threat for the Abyssinian Empire during the peak of power for the Muslim State of Adal. Awbare was one of the biggest cities of the former Adal Empire. It is the final resting place of Sheikh Awbare, whose tomb is located west of the town. According to historical accounts, both the celebrated patron Saints Awbare and Awbube hail from the ancient Dir clan family. Both the tombs of the celebrated patron Saints Awbare and Awbube are much frequented and under the protection of the local Gadabuursi Dir clan who dominate the region in which they are buried. Awbare was the seat of one branch of the Gadabuursi Ugasate/Sultanate family (Reer Ugaas) during the colonial period. Many of the Gadabuursi traditional leaders and kings were from this town, such as Ugaas Rooble Ugaas Nuur (buried near the town), Ugaas Cabdi Ugaas Rooble (who was crowned leader during the Italian occupation of Ethiopia), Ugaas Rooble Ugaas Doodi (Ugaas Rooble III) and many others. The Ugaas on the Abyssinian side of the border around Awbare and the Hararghe region was known as Dejazmach (ደጃዝማች ) or 'Commander of the Gate'.

Old Town of Awbare

Awbare is situated over 1,000 m above sea level. The old town contained over 200 houses, each built with stone walls and mason ranging from single room to multi-roomed courtyard houses. Niches were cut in the walls for storage, and they were roofed with brushwood laid over wooden rafters. The mosques were more ambitiously planned.

Richard Francis Burton (1856) describes the old ruined town upon visitation as he passed by, in his book First Footsteps in East Africa:

"Without returning the salutations of the Bedouins, who loudly summoned us to stop and give them the news, we trotted forwards in search of a deserted sheep-fold. At sunset we passed, upon an eminence on our left, the ruins of an ancient settlement, called after its patron Saint, Ao Barhe: and both sides of the mountain road were flanked by tracts of prairie-land, beautifully purpling in the evening air."

Demographics

The town is inhabited by the Gadabuursi subclan of the Dir clan family. With the majority of the inhabitants belonging to the Faarah Nuur, one of the two sub divisions of Reer Nuur, a clan of the Makahiil Gadabuursi.
The town also has a sizeable population of the Reer Ugaas subclan of the Makayl-Dheere branch of the Makahiil Gadabuursi.

The Department of Sociology and Social Administration, Addis Ababa University, Vol. 1 (1994), describes the Awbare district as being predominantly Gadabuursi. The journal states:
"Different aid groups were also set up to help communities cope in the predominantly Gadabursi district of Aw Bare."

Filipo Ambrosio (1994) describes the Awbare district as being predominantly Gadabuursi whilst highlighting the neutral role that they played in mediating peace between the Geri and Jarso: 
"The Gadabursi, who dominate the adjacent Awbare district north of Jijiga and bordering with the Awdal Region of Somaliland, have opened the already existing camps of Derwanache and Teferi Ber to these two communities."

Based on figures from the Central Statistical Agency in 2005, Awbare of 35,977 inhabitants 18,978 are men and 16,999 are women. The 1997 census reported this town had a total population of 24,125 of whom 12,538 were men and 11,587 women. 1994 Population and Housing Census of Ethiopia: Results for Somali Region, Vol. 1 Tables 2.4, 2.13 (accessed 10 January 2009). The results of the 1994 census in the Somali Region were not satisfactory, so the census was repeated in 1997.

Education 
Awbare has many schools. One of the most famous being Sheikh Hassan Nuriye Primary and Intermediate school.

Notable residents
Ugaas Rooble Ugaas Nuur (died: 1938) - Ugaas of the Gadabuursi clan.
Ugaas Cabdi Ugaas Rooble (died: 1941) - Ugaas of the Gadabuursi clan.
Ugaas Rooble Ugaas Doodi (died: 1977) - Ugaas of the Gadabuursi clan.
Sheikh Hassan Nuriye - Somali scholar, saint and teacher.

Notes

Populated places in the Somali Region
Gadabuursi